The Hall XPTBH was a prototype American twin-engined seaplane, submitted to the United States Navy by the Hall Aluminum Aircraft Corporation in response to a 1934 specification for new bomber and scout aircraft. Constructed in an innovative fashion that made extensive use of aluminum, the XPTBH proved successful in flight testing, but failed to win favor with the U.S. Navy. No production contract was awarded, and the single aircraft built served in experimental duties before its destruction in a hurricane during 1938.

Design and development
In late 1934, the U.S. Navy's Bureau of Aeronautics (BuAer) issued a specification for new scout bomber and torpedo bomber designs. Eight companies submitted a total of ten designs in response, evenly split between monoplanes and biplanes. The Hall Aluminum Aircraft Company submitted the only seaplane design; a single prototype was ordered by the Navy for evaluation on June 30, 1934. Given the designation XPTBH-1, it became the only aircraft to receive three mission-type letters under the U.S. Navy's designation system used between 1922 and 1962.

Hall's choice of the twin-float seaplane configuration was dictated by the Navy's requirement that the new torpedo-bomber design should be capable of carrying a standard naval torpedo of the type carried by destroyers. As ordered, the XPTBH-1 was intended to be fitted with Wright R-1820 "Cyclone" radial engines; delays in design caused by Hall relocating their production facility, difficulties with the contract, and doubts about the aircraft's performance potential led to a redesign, the aircraft becoming slightly smaller and the engines being changed to a pair of Pratt & Whitney R-1830 "Twin Wasp" radials. The changes to the aircraft resulted in it receiving the revised designation XPTBH-2.

Utilising Hall's standard aluminum tubular spar, the fuselage and wing leading edges were covered in aluminum, while the rest of the wing and the control surfaces were fabric-covered. The aircraft was well-armed defensively by 1930s standards, with a powered turret, designed by Hall, mounted in the nose and carrying a single .30-caliber machine gun. Hand-traversed mountings for a pair of machine guns were fitted in dorsal (top) and ventral (belly) positions aft.

Operational history
Delivered to the Navy on January 30, 1937, the aircraft was officially presented to the public at Hall's Bristol, Pennsylvania factory in April of that year. The aircraft's early flight testing, starting in February and conducted by test pilot Bill McAvoy, showed that the XPTBH had few faults, with the only significant issue being a lack of roll authority – a reduction of the ability of the ailerons to turn the aircraft – as a result of the surface area of the floats. A modification to increase the area of the rudder solved the issue. The aircraft's water-handling characteristics were found to be excellent; the only significant complaints that surfaced during the testing period concerned the XPTBH-2's beaching gear, which was found to be extremely difficult to use in anything other than the calmest water.

Although the XPTBH-2 met most of its design specifications and was rated overall very good in flight testing, it failed to meet the contractual requirements for top speed and attack speed. In addition, the U.S. Navy did not consider a seagoing torpedo-bomber to be an aircraft for which there was an operational requirement; the fact that as a floatplane the aircraft was restricted to operation from water was also considered a negative, while the aircraft's "three-in-one" role led it to be viewed as a jack of all trades, purpose-designed aircraft for each role being considered superior. The company, however, blamed Navy politics for the lack of a production order.

Following the conclusion of its test program, the XPTBH-2 was used for experimental duties at the Naval Torpedo Station in Newport, Rhode Island, participating in trials of aerial torpedoes. Its service at Newport came to an end on September 21, 1938, when the XPTBH-2 was destroyed during the Great New England Hurricane. The XPTBH-2 was the last aircraft designed by Hall Aluminum; the company remained in business until 1940, when it was bought out by Consolidated Aircraft.

Specifications (XPTBH-2)

See also

References

Notes

Citations

Bibliography

External links

 "Hall XPTBH-2", Aviation Enthusiast Corner
 American airplanes: Ha – Hu, Aerofiles
 June 1938 cover, Model Airplane News

PTB1H
Floatplanes
1930s United States bomber aircraft
1930s United States patrol aircraft
High-wing aircraft
Aircraft first flown in 1937
Twin piston-engined tractor aircraft